The 1956–57 season was Mansfield Town's 19th season in the Football League and 14th season in the Third Division North, they finished in 16th position with 44 points.

Final league table

Results

Football League Third Division North

FA Cup

Squad statistics
 Squad list sourced from

References
General
 Mansfield Town 1956–57 at soccerbase.com (use drop down list to select relevant season)

Specific

Mansfield Town F.C. seasons
Mansfield Town